Mineville is a hamlet and census-designated place (CDP) in the town of Moriah in Essex County, New York. The population was 1,269 at the 2010 census. Prior to the 2010 census, it was part of the Mineville-Witherbee, New York census-designated place. Mineville and Witherbee are located in the northern part of Moriah, northwest of Port Henry. Mineville was named for the iron ore mines that used to operate here.

Geography

Demographics

References

Census-designated places in New York (state)
Census-designated places in Essex County, New York
Mining communities in New York (state)